Roubaix–Huy was a road bicycle race held annually in Belgium and France, between Roubaix and Huy. It was first held in 1947 and held annually until 1956. It was a one-day race each year except for 1950 when there were two stages, first from Huy to Roubaix and Roubaix back to Huy the next day.

Winners

External links
 

Defunct cycling races in Belgium
Defunct cycling races in France
Recurring sporting events established in 1947
Recurring sporting events disestablished in 1956
1947 establishments in France
1947 establishments in Belgium
Cycle races in France
Cycle races in Belgium
1956 disestablishments in France
1956 disestablishments in Belgium
Sport in Roubaix
Sport in Liège Province
Huy